Blue-Tongue Films is an Australian film collective and production company, composed of filmmakers Kieran Darcy-Smith, Luke Doolan, Joel Edgerton, Nash Edgerton, Mirrah Foulkes, Sean Kruck, David Michôd and Spencer Susser. Founded in 1996, Blue-Tongue has created a number of feature films as Animal Kingdom, Hesher, The Square, Wish You Were Here, and The Gift, several short films, including Bear, Crossbow, The Magician  I Love Sarah Jane, Miracle Fish and Spider, as well as music videos for artists such as Ben Lee, Bob Dylan, Brandon Flowers, Empire of the Sun, Eskimo Joe, Evermore, Lana Del Rey, Missy Higgins, Rahzel, and The Veronicas.

Filmography

Feature films

Television

Short films

References

External links 
 
 

Australian filmmakers
Film collectives